Ali & Ratu Ratu Queens is a 2021 Indonesian  comedy-drama film directed by Lucky Kuswandi, written by Ginatri S. Noer and Muhammad Zaidy and starring Iqbaal Dhiafakhri Ramadhan, Marissa Anita, Aurora Ribero and Nirina Zubir. Ramadhan portrays the son from a divorced household visiting his mother (Anita) at New York City to reconcile.

Plot 
In Jakarta, 17-year-old Ali watches his dying father, Hasan, die of heart attack. Ali's mother Mia left them for New York City (NYC) when he was five. Initially believing that Mia had died, Ali finds letters, postcards, and flight tickets for Ali to visit Mia in New York, which Hasan hid from him. Ali reveals his desire to search for his mother in NYC, and after heated negotiations, his helicopter aunt Suci gives him two weeks. He visits an apartment in Queens where his mother stayed previously and meets her friend Party, who works as a cleaner. She shares the same apartment with Biyah, a -turned-paparazzi; Ance, a single helicopter mom; and Chinta, a masseuse. Compensated with money, they pledge to help Ali's search for Mia. They also guide Ali through NYC, and Ali helps them in their jobs so that they can earn US$10,000 to open an Indonesian restaurant, Ratu Ratu Queens. Ali develops a crush on Eva, Ance's daughter born in NYC.

Through a friend, Biyah learns that Mia resides in Fort Greene, Brooklyn. Ali decides to visit her, who is shocked at his presence and slams the door. Ali also learns that Mia has a new husband, Alex, a son and daughter. The next day, Ali re-attempts to engage with her and reveals Hasan's death. Mia expresses her condolences and shares her phone number. Ali and Mia meet up in a cafe near Ali's apartment, and the two spend the day together but end awry as Ali asks his mom to include him in her new family; she says this could ruin her household, also revealing that Hasan ignorantly prohibited Ali from flying to New York with the ticket she purchased.

Ali invites Mia to a Thanksgiving dinner at her old apartment. Mia feels taunted passive-aggressively by Biyah, Ance, and Chinta on her actions when Ali shows up at her doorstep. Feeling guilty, she hands a US$20,000 check to Party, directed towards Ali, and informs Party to convince Ali to return to Indonesia. Assuming Party and her friends are only after his money, Ali expresses betrayal and leaves the apartment. Mia reveals that she indeed provided the check, reasoning that she cannot abandon her new family and wants Ali to return. She tearfully responds that the more she meets Ali, the more guilty she feels for leaving him. Ali reluctantly asks her to disown her. Mia tearfully confesses that she has been a terrible mother and tells Ali to hate her so he can leave.

Ali leaves, staying up through predawn, and meets up with Eva, who advises him to go back to the apartment. He complies, and shows Party, Biyah, Ance, and Chinta a video he edited using videos he recorded while living with them, expressing his apology and positivity. They reconcile, and Ali accepts them as his new family. In the end, Ali is accepted into a local university, and as Christmas nears, Mia confides on Ali in private to Alex. In a mid-credits scene, Ali's cousin flies to NYC to meet Ali upon Suci's demand.

Cast 
 Iqbaal Ramadhan as Ali
 Marissa Anita as Mia, Ali's estranged mother
 Aurora Ribero as Eva
 Nirina Zubir as Party
 Tika Panggabean as Ance
 Asri Welas as Biyah
 Happy Salma as Chinta
 Bayu Skak as Zulpang
 Ibnu Jamil as Hasan, Ali's deceased father
 Cut Mini Theo as Bude
 Arief Didu as Pakde
 Reza Rahadian

Release
It was released on June 17, 2021, on Netflix.

Accolades

References

External links 
 
 

2021 films
2020s Indonesian-language films
Indonesian-language Netflix original films
2021 direct-to-video films
2021 comedy-drama films
Indonesian comedy-drama films